Novel American was an American rock band from Nashville, Tennessee, formed in 2011. They were formed following guitarist Josh Farro's departure from Paramore and consisted of Farro, Ryan Clark (bass, backing vocals) formerly of Cecil Adora, and Zac Farro (drums, percussion). Josh Farro's brother and former Paramore bandmate Zac joined as drummer following the departure of former Cecil Adora members Tyler Ward and Van Beasley in May 2011. 

The band never released any material and officially disbanded in 2014.

History

Guitarist Josh Farro was a member of Paramore, having formed the band with his brother Zac as well as Hayley Williams. After releasing three successful studio albums, both Josh and Zac departed the band in 2010. Though initially  unsure if he wanted to be in another band, Farro jammed with friends, former Cecil Adora members Van Beasley, Ryan Clark and Tyler Ward. They decided to form another band, choosing the name Novel American, which was suggested by Farro's wife. The group planned to record an EP as well as play local venues in the future. It was announced in February that Josh's brother Zac became the band's new drummer in place of Ward. In April, the band posted clips of new material on their Facebook page. However, the following month, Novel American confirmed the departure of vocalist Van Beasley, citing creative differences.

In May 2014, Josh Farro announced that Novel American no longer exists.

The band have cited groups such as Jimmy Eat World, Radiohead, Explosions in the Sky and Sigur Rós as influences.

Band members
Van Beasley – lead vocals, rhythm guitar, piano (2011)
Ryan Clark – bass, backing vocals (2011–2014)
Josh Farro – lead guitar (2011–2014)
Tyler Ward – drums, percussion (2011)
Zac Farro – drums, percussion (2011–2014)

Timeline

References

External links

Alternative rock groups from Tennessee
Musical groups established in 2011
Musical groups from Nashville, Tennessee
2011 establishments in Tennessee